Forever: Rich Thugs, Book One is the sixth studio album by American hip hop group Above the Law. It was released on October 26, 1999 for Street Solid Records.

On this album, Cold 187um appeared as Big Hutch and KM.G as Chicken Vin. The album featured guest appearances from Safecracka, Young Ten, and Ha-Ha L.O.C., and its audio production was handled by Big Mil, Tha Chill, DJ Silk, Nick, and A.T.L. themselves.

Track listing

Personnel
Gregory Fernan Hutchinson - producer (tracks 3, 5-6, 9, 12), co-producer (6-7, 11-12, 15), executive producer, mixing (tracks 1, 3, 5, 11-12, 15)
Kevin Michael Gulley - producer (track 9), co-producer (tracks 6-7, 11-12), executive producer, mixing (tracks 2, 6-7)
Anthony Stewart - producer (track 9), co-producer (tracks 6-7, 11-12), executive producer, mixing (tracks 2, 6-7)
Big Mil - producer (tracks 1, 8, 11, 14-15), mixing (tracks 1, 8-9, 11, 14-15), recording (tracks 8-9, 11)
Vernon Johnson - producer (tracks 6, 9), mixing & additional vocals (track 6)
Russell Brown - producer & mixing (track 2)
Nick - producer & mixing (track 7)
Tim House - mixing (tracks 8-9), recording (tracks 1, 3, 5, 8-9, 11-12, 14-15), A&R direction
Jay Gonzalez - mixing (track 11), recording (tracks 1-2)
Kathy Longinaker - photography
Imix Design - art direction
Young Ten - guest vocals (tracks 2, 6, 15)
Safecracka - guest vocals (tracks 2, 15)
Boom Bam - guest vocals (track 2, 14)
Ha-Ha L.O.C. - guest vocals (track 15)

References

1999 albums
Above the Law (group) albums
Albums produced by Cold 187um